Ernest L. Hazelius House is a historic home located at Lexington, Lexington County, South Carolina. It was built about 1830, and is a one-story, rectangular frame dwelling with a hall and parlor plan and four small bedrooms across the rear.  It was the home of Ernest L. Hazelius, a clergyman of the Lutheran Church, academician, philosopher, author, and educator. The house was also the location where the traveling evangelist Charlie Tillman wrote down the song "Give Me that Old Time Religion" after hearing African-American citizens singing it.

It was listed on the National Register of Historic Places in 1973  and became a part of the Lexington County Museum in 1974, where it serves as the museum's tour office.

References

Houses on the National Register of Historic Places in South Carolina
Houses completed in 1830
Houses in Lexington County, South Carolina
National Register of Historic Places in Lexington County, South Carolina
1830 establishments in South Carolina